Gephyromantis blanci, commonly known as the white Madagascar frog, is a species of frog in the family Mantellidae.
It is endemic to Madagascar and is found in the southeast of the island. Its natural habitat rainforest leaf litter; it tolerates some habitat degradation. It is not dependent on water and is presumed to reproduce through direct development (i.e., without free-living tadpole stage). It is threatened by habitat loss. It occurs in Ranomafana, Midongy du sud, and Andringitra National Parks.

References

blanci
Endemic frogs of Madagascar
Taxa named by Jean Marius René Guibé
Amphibians described in 1974
Taxonomy articles created by Polbot